Sir Mark Moody-Stuart KCMG (born 15 September 1940) is a British businessman, He was appointed non-executive chairman of Anglo American PLC in 2001, serving until 2009. He has been chairman of Hermes Equity Ownership Services since 2009.

He is a former chairman of Royal Dutch Shell and a director of HSBC Holdings and of Accenture. He is chairman of the Foundation for the Global Compact and was a director of the Global Reporting Initiative (GRI) until December 2007. He is a director of Saudi Aramco. He was knighted in 2000 (KCMG).

Moody-Stuart became a managing director of Shell Transport and Trading Company plc in 1991 and was chairman of Royal Dutch/Shell from 1998-2001. He was succeeded by Sir Philip Watts.

In February 2008, he hit the headlines with a call for a ban on "gas-guzzlers".

Family and education
He was born in Antigua the son of a sugar plantation owner, and educated at Shrewsbury School and at St. John's College, Cambridge, where he obtained a PhD on a thesis on the Devonian sediments of Spitsbergen. He became a Fellow of this College in 2001.

In 1964, he married Judy McLeavy. They have three sons and a daughter.

Career with Shell
1966 Joined Shell
Geologist in Spain, Oman and Brunei
1972 Chief Geologist in Australia
1976 Leader of North Sea exploration teams, Shell UK Expro
1976 Manager, Western Division Shell Petroleum Development Company, Nigeria.
1979 General Manager, Turkey
1982 Chairman and Chief Executive, Malaysia
1990 Exploration and Production Co-ordinator
1991 Group Managing Director
1998 Chairman of the Committee of Managing Directors of the Royal Dutch/Shell Group 
2001 Gave up Chair of Shell but remained on the Board
2005 Retired from Shell

Publications
Responsible Leadership: Lessons From the Front Line of Sustainability and Ethics, Greenleaf Publishing, 2014.

References

External links
Global Reporting Initiative
Interview with Guardian Business

1940 births
Living people
People educated at Shrewsbury School
Alumni of St John's College, Cambridge
Directors of Shell plc
HSBC people
Knights Commander of the Order of St Michael and St George
Chief Executive Officers of Shell plc